"The Thing-ummy-Bob [That's Going To Win The War]" is a 1942 song, written by Gordon Thompson with music by David Heneker, which celebrates the female production-line workers of World War II making components for complex weapons to win the war.  Its chorus is 

A thingumabob or thingummy is an extended form of the word thing which the Oxford English Dictionary records being used as far back as 1751.

The song was popularized by performers Arthur Askey and Gracie Fields.

References

Songs of World War II
Songs about labor
1942 songs
Gracie Fields songs